Dergview Football Club is a semi-professional, Northern Irish football club playing in the NIFL Championship.

History
The club, founded in 1980, hails from Castlederg, County Tyrone, Northern Ireland, and plays its matches at Darragh Park. Club colours are red, black, and white. They are nicknamed 'Constitution' or 'The Constitutes'.

Portadown legend Richard Clarke was appointed manager in June 2013. He resigned in February 2018.

Current squad

Honours

Senior honours
North West Senior Cup: 2
2020–21, 2021–22

Intermediate honours
IFA Intermediate League Second Division: 1
2007–08
Fermanagh & Western Intermediate Cup: 1
2009–10

References

 

Association football clubs established in 1980
Association football clubs in Northern Ireland
NIFL Championship clubs
Association football clubs in County Tyrone
1980 establishments in Northern Ireland